Omar Jasseh (born November 1, 1992 in Banjul) is a Gambian footballer currently without a club.

Career
Jasseh began playing in academies at the age of 12 in his native Gambia. He played for Maccassa and Samger, before spending three years in England with youth academies at Charlton Athletic, Chelsea and Crystal Palace.  Crystal Palace then went on to offer Jasseh a contract but was unable to complete the accord due to visa restrictions.

Jasseh came to the United States in 2009 and trained with Toronto FC, before signing with the Major League Soccer side San Jose Earthquakes on April 14, 2010. This made him the youngest player to sign with the team in franchise history.

Jasseh made his professional debut on April 24, 2010 in a match against Chivas USA. During his stint in San Jose Jasseh missed much time with his team due to national team duty. Jasseh went on to help his team qualify for the Orange African Youth Championship defeating Ivory Coast in a home and away tie.  Jasseh was not happy with the lack of opportunity for first team football so Jasseh asked to be released so he could explore other options.  The management agreed as the move would also open an international player roster spot and thus Jasseh was waived by the Earthquakes on July 19, 2011 during the summer transfer period.

References

External links
 

1992 births
Living people
Sportspeople from Banjul
Gambian footballers
Association football midfielders
Charlton Athletic F.C. players
Chelsea F.C. players
Crystal Palace F.C. players
San Jose Earthquakes players
Major League Soccer players
AC Kajaani players
Gambian expatriate footballers
Gambian expatriate sportspeople in the United States
Expatriate soccer players in the United States